Sarsfields GAA may refer to:

 Sarsfields GAA (Cork), a hurling club in Riverstown and Glanmire, Ireland
 Sarsfields GAA (Galway), a sports club in Bullaun, New Inn and Woodlawn, Ireland
 Sarsfields GAA (Newbridge), a sports club in County Kildare, Ireland
 Ardnaree Sarsfields GAA, a sports club in Ballina, County Mayo, Ireland
 Charlestown Sarsfields GAA, a sports club in County Mayo, Ireland
 Frankfurt Sarsfields GAA, a sports club in Hesse, Germany
 High Moss Sarsfields GFC, a sports club in Derrytrasna
 Lucan Sarsfields, a sports club in Dublin, Ireland
 Patrick Sarsfields GAA, a sports club in Belfast
 Thurles Sarsfields GAA, a sports club in County Tipperary, Ireland